Carlton Davis Mays, Jr. (born April 8, 1981), professionally known as Honorable C.N.O.T.E., is an American hip hop record producer and songwriter.

Mays started producing at the age of 15 in the Benton Harbor Area of Michigan, before moving to Atlanta in 2006. He has over 7,000 placements on albums and is perhaps best known for producing "New Level" by rapper A$AP Ferg, as well as the song "M'$" by rapper A$AP Rocky. Mays has also produced several tracks for various artists such as 2 Chainz, Migos, Ne-Yo, Flo Rida, Gucci Mane, Travis Scott, Yo Gotti, Future, Meek Mill, and Trippie Redd among others.

Production discography

Charted songs

Production credits

Birdman – 5 * Stunna (2007)
18. "So Tired" (featuring Lil Wayne)

Flo Rida – Mail on Sunday (2008)
01. "American Superstar" (featuring Lil Wayne)
12. "Don't Know How to Act" (featuring Yung Joc)

2 Pistols – Death Before Dishonor (2008) 
02. "Death Before Dishonor"
04. "Been Throwin' Money"

Mack 10 – Soft White (2009)
11. "Dedication (To the Pen)"

Eminem – Relapse 2 (Unreleased) (2009)
00. "Hit Me With Your Best Shot" (featuring D12)

B.o.B – B.o.B Presents: The Adventures of Bobby Ray (2010)
14. "I See Ya" (American iTunes deluxe edition bonus track / Target edition bonus track)

Bizarre – Friday Night at St. Andrews (2010)
05. "Pussy" (featuring Fiona Simone and KB)
10. "Believer" (featuring Tech N9ne and Nate Walka)
16. "Warning" (featuring Bonecrusher and Anamul House)

Z-Ro – Meth (2011)
01. "Real or Fake"

Coke Boys – Coke Boys 3 (2012)
15. "Dirty Money" (French Montana featuring L.E.P. Bogus Boyz)

Future – Pluto (2012)
12. "Long Live the Pimp" (featuring Trae tha Truth)

Waka Flocka Flame – Triple F Life: Friends, Fans & Family (2012)
08. "Candy Paint & Gold Teeth" (featuring Bun B and Ludacris; produced with Redwine)
19. "Barry Bonds" (featuring ASAP and P Smurf)

Gucci Mane – Trap God (2012)
19. "I Fuck With That" (produced with Mike Will Made It and Southside)

Gucci Mane – Trap God 2 (2013)
07. "Bob Marley"
23. "Supposed 2" (produced with Zaytoven)

Gucci Mane -World War 3:Lean (2013)
00. "Servin Lean" (Peewee Longway)
00. "Extacy Pill" (Young Thug)

Gucci Mane – Trap House III (2013)
03. "Use Me" (featuring 2 Chainz)
05. "Hell Yes"
06. "I Heard" (featuring Rich Homie Quan; produced with Lex Luger)
15. "Chasen Paper" (featuring Rich Homie Quan and Young Thug)
16. "Off the Leash" (featuring PeeWee Longway and Young Thug)

2 Chainz – B.O.A.T.S. II: Me Time (2013)
07. "Netflix" (featuring Fergie; produced with Diplo and DJA)
10. "Beautiful Pain" (featuring Lloyd and Mase)

Yo Gotti – I Am (2013)
09. "Die a Real Nigga"

Lil Bibby – Free Crack (2013)
03. "Change"

E-40 – The Block Brochure: Welcome to the Soil 6 (2013)
05. "Pablo" (featuring Gucci Mane and Trinidad James)

Lil B – 05 Fuck Em (2013)
02. "Welcome to 05"

Gucci Mane – The State vs. Radric Davis II: The Caged Bird Sings (2013)
06. "Double"
09. "Too Many"
17. "Threw With That Shit"

Meek Mill – I Don't Know – Single (2014)
01. "I Don't Know" (featuring Paloma Ford; produced with CyFyre)

G Herbo – Welcome to Fazoland (2014)
16. "All I Got" (featuring Lil Bibby)

Gucci Mane – Trap House 4 (2014)
06. "Drugs Like You"
19. "Outro"

Migos – No Label 2 (2014)
15. "Freak No More"

Kevin Gates – By Any Means (2014)
09. "Bet I'm on It" (featuring 2 Chainz)

Gucci Mane – Trap God 3 (2014)
07. "Swole Pocket Shawty"
10. "Start Pimpin'" (featuring Chief Keef)
11. "Finger Waves"

Gucci Mane – The Oddfather (2014)
03. "Kick Door" (featuring OJ da Juiceman; produced with C4)

Lil Bibby – Free Crack 2 (2014)
15. "Tomorrow"

Gucci Mane – East Atlanta Santa (2014)
12. "Riding Dirty" (produced with Metro Boomin and Doughboy Beatz)

Gucci Mane – 1017 Mafia: Incarcerated (2015)
08. "Story" (featuring Young Dolph)

Rae Sremmurd – SremmLife (2015)
11. "Safe Sex Pay Checks"

Ne-Yo – Non-Fiction (2015)
20. "Worth It" (produced with Jesse "Corporal" Wilson and Chucky Thompson)

 G Unit – The Beast Is G Unit (2015)
02. "I'm Grown"

 Gucci Mane – Trap House 5 (2015)
13. "Constantly" (featuring Chief Keef)

 A$AP Rocky – At. Long. Last. ASAP (2015)
15. "M'$" (featuring Lil Wayne; produced with Mike Dean)

 Migos – Yung Rich Nation (2015)
01. "Memoirs"
02. "Dab Daddy"
04. "Spray the Champagne" (produced with Murda Beatz)
05. "Street Nigga Sacrifice"
06. "Highway 85"
13. "Trap Funk"

 K Camp – Only Way Is Up (2015) 
03. "Yellow Brick Road" (produced with Big Fruit)
11. "Rolling" (featuring Snoop Dogg)

 Pusha T – King Push – Darkest Before Dawn: The Prelude (2015)
04. "Crutches, Crosses, Caskets" (produced with Puff Daddy, Mario Winans, Sean C & LV, and Yung Dev)

 Yo Gotti – The Art of Hustle (2016)
13. "Hunnid" (featuring Pusha T)
14. "Luv Deez Hoes" (featuring 2 Chainz)

 2 Chainz – ColleGrove (2016)
02. "Smell Like Money" (featuring Lil Wayne)

 A$AP Ferg – Always Strive and Prosper (2016)
07. "New Level" (featuring Future)

 Belly – Another Day in Paradise (2016)
04. "Exotic" (featuring Waka Flocka Flame)

 DJ Drama – Quality Street Music 2 (2016)
07. "Onyx" (featuring Ty Dolla $ign, Trey Songz, and August Alsina)
09. "Back and Forth" (featuring Skeme and Yakki Divioshi)

 Travis Scott – Birds in the Trap Sing McKnight (2016)
02. "way back" (produced with Hit-Boy, Cashmere Cat, Rogét Chahayed, and Mike Dean)

Gucci Mane – Woptober (2016)
04. "Money Machine" (featuring Rick Ross)

Migos – (2016)
"Dat Way" (featuring Rich The Kid)

SremmLife Crew – Adult Swim Singles Program 2016
20. "Ball Out the Lot" (featuring Bobo Swae and Swae Lee) 

A$AP Ferg – New Level (Remix) – Single (2016)
01. "New Level (Remix)" (featuring Future, A$AP Rocky, and Lil Uzi Vert)

Meek Mill – DC4 (2016)
11 "Way Up" (featuring Tracy T)

Gucci Mane – (2016)
01. "Floor Seats" (featuring Quavo)

Lil Uzi Vert & Gucci Mane – 1017 vs. The World (2016)
01. "Changed My Phone"
02. "Today!!"

Kodak Black – Painting Pictures (2017)
16. "Feeling Like" (featuring Jeezy) (produced with Derelle Rideout)

Zaytoven (2017)
00. "East Atlanta Day" (featuring Gucci Mane and 21 Savage) (produced with Zaytoven)

Philthy Rich (2017)
00. "Water Leak" (featuring Lil Uzi Vert, Offset and Sauce Walka)

Meek Mill -  Wins & Losses (2017)
12 "Glow Up"

Trippie Redd (2017)
"Dark Knight Dummo"  (featuring Travis Scott)

Quality Control – Quality Control: Control the Streets Volume 1 (2017)
13. "The Load"  (featuring Gucci Mane, Lil Baby & Marlo)
18. "Holiday"  (featuring Lil Yachty & Quavo) (Produced with Supah Mario)

Migos – Culture II (2018)
02. "Supastars"   (produced with Buddah Bless, DJ Durel and Quavo) 

Gucci Mane, Migos, Lil Yachty (2018)
00. "Solitaire"

Christina Aguilera – Liberation (2018)
12. "Accelerate" 

scarlxrd (2018)
00 "MAD MAN."

Trippie Redd (2018)
"Ghost Busters"  (featuring Quavo, XXXTentacion, $ki Mask The Slump God)

Jack Harlow – Loose (2018)
04. "Slide For Me"

Jack Harlow – Confetti (2019)
04. "Sunday Night"

21 Savage & Metro Boomin - Savage Mode II (2020)

 03. "Glock in My Lap" (produced with Metro Boomin & Southside)

Notes

References

External links 

 
 

African-American record producers
Living people
American hip hop record producers
Southern hip hop musicians
Musicians from Michigan
Production discographies
1981 births
21st-century African-American people
20th-century African-American people